This is a list of members of the National Parliament of Papua New Guinea from 1972 to 2022, as elected at the 2017 election.

Former MPs in 10th Parliament

References

List
Papua New Guinea politics-related lists